The 2000 Senior League World Series took place from August 13–19 in Kissimmee, Florida, United States. Panama City, Panama defeated Pinellas Park, Florida twice in the championship game.

Teams

Results

Winner's Bracket

Loser's Bracket

Placement Bracket

Elimination Round

References

Senior League World Series
Senior League World Series
2000 in sports in Florida